Jarudiyah is among the first branches of Zaidiyyah, attributed to Abul Jaroud Ziyad Ibn Mansur. This sect was also known as Shorobiyah, because Shoroub was the title of Abu Jaroud. Among the theorists of the Jarudiyah are Fazl ibn Zubayr al Rasani, Mansour Ibn Abi Al Aswad, and Haroun Ibn Saad al Ajli. Abu Khalid al Vaseti is another prominent figure in this school.  Jarudiyah beliefs include: Zayd Ibn Ali ibn Hussein as successor, Ali's preference over other Sahabah and the necessity of rising up against a Tyrant.

History
The Jarudiyah are counted as the first branch of Zaidiyyah. Jozef Van Ess called this sect Sorhoubiyyah. Two people had important roles in theoretical basics of this sect. One of them is Abu Al Jaroud as the one who established this school and the other is Abu Khalid, the one who was heir of Jaroudiyyah's teaching.

Principles
What we know about this sect is only restricted to religious teaching, particularly leadership or imamate. This sect in opposition to other sects of Zaydiyyah but in accordance with shia, affirms the right of succession after  the prophet as the exclusive right of Ali.  Therefore, they do not believe in the succession of Abu Bakr, Umar ibn al-Khattab and Uthman ibn Affan. They believe that there is a hidden text (nass khafi) approving of Ali as the right successor to the Prophet.  According to Jarudiyah, some traditions evidently designate the succession of Ali. Al-Shaykh Al-Mufid believed that only Imamiah and Jarudiyah deserve to be called Shia. They have two beliefs on the determination of successor by the Prophet:

 One group said that the Prophet had determined Ali as successor by revealed text or nass. Ali, in turn, designated Hasan as successor and Hasan ibn Ali orderly determined Hosein as successor.
 Another group said that the Prophet Muhammad treated a revealed text for Ali however the Prophet determined another revealed text for Hasan and Hosein ibn Ali. They believe that there is no other revealed text for other Imams who were not present during the Prophet's era.

As for the knowledge of Imams, Jaroudyyah believes that the Imam has innate knowledge regardless of acquiring knowledge by education. In other words, Imams have inborn knowledge from the very beginning.  These beliefs are found among Yemeni Zaydis today.

References

Further reading

External links
http://www.cgie.org.ir/fa/publication/entryview/2425

Zaidiyyah